Madah Berhelah is the debut album of Malaysian singer Ziana Zain, released by BMG Music in Malaysia on 25 December 1991. The album incorporates elements of pop, ballads and traditional music and Ziana works closely with famous local composers including Fauzi Marzuki and Saari Amri.

The lead single of the album, "Madah Berhelah", was both a critical and commercial success. It was considered to be Ziana's signature song which helped establish her career. The single was a finalist in the 1992's Anugerah Juara Lagu in Creative Pop category. However, the song was lost to Nash's "Pada Syurga Di Wajahmu". The album also includes another single, "Riwayat Cinta".

Madah Berhelah had sold 40,000 copies in Malaysia and was certified Gold by RIM.

Track listing
 "Riwayat Cinta" (Faisal Aziz) — 3:52
 "Kehidupan" (Rahim Othman, Megat Ismail) — 4:58
 "Ke Mana Perginya Cahaya" (Ajib, Rosli Ali) — 4:55
 "Kekalkan Warisan" (Ajib, Rosli Ali) — 4:50
 "Cinta Gugur Satu-Satu" (Ali Noor, Usop) — 5:10
 "Teruna Dara" (Rahim Othman, Rosli Ali) — 4:15
 "Sebelum Terlewat Waktu" (Rahim Othman, Juwie) — 4:38
 "Rentak Hidupku" (Rahim Othman, Megat Ismail) — 4:55
 "Dalam Kesakitan Ini" (Fauzi Marzuki, Lukhman S.) — 5:09
 "Madah Berhelah" (Saari Amri) — 4:48

Anugerah Juara Lagu

|-
| rowspan=2| 1992 || rowspan=2|"Madah Berhelah" || Best Creative Pop song || 
|-
| Best Song|| 
|-

Personnel
 Producer - Rahim Othman
 Executive producer - Hamid
 Studio - King studio & Channel 11
 Mixing - David, Zairi & Fauzi
 Mastering - Danny & Thana
 Keyboard - Rahman Othman, Jenny Chin & Boon
 Piano - Boon
 Guitar - Ajib & Fauzi Marzuki
 Bass - Mat Mega & Fauzi Marzuki
 Drum - Munir & Gary Gideon
 Strings - Fauzi Marzuki
 Composer - Ajib, Rahim Othman & Fauzi Marzuki
 Promotion Management - Ritta, Azhar & Amran

References

Ziana Zain albums
1991 debut albums
Bertelsmann Music Group albums
Malay-language albums